The General Union of Workers (UGT) is a national trade union center in Portugal. It was formed in 1978 and has a membership of 400,000. It is traditionally influenced by the Socialist Party.

The UGT is affiliated with the International Trade Union Confederation, and the European Trade Union Confederation.

References

External links

Socialist Party (Portugal)
Trade unions in Portugal
Trade unions established in 1978